First Monday is an American legal drama television series which aired on CBS during the midseason replacement from January 15 to May 3, 2002. The series centered on the U.S. Supreme Court. Like another 2002 series, The Court, it was inspired by the prominent role the Supreme Court played in settling the 2000 presidential election. However, public interest in the Supreme Court had receded by the time the two shows premiered, and neither was successful.

Premise
Created by JAG creator Donald P. Bellisario and Paul Levine, the show aired on CBS from January until May 2002.  The name First Monday is a reference to the first Monday in October, which is when each Supreme Court term begins.

Joe Mantegna starred as moderate Justice Joseph Novelli, who is appointed to a Supreme Court evenly divided between conservatives and liberals.  The show examined how the law clerks and justices dealt with issues and cases that came before the highest court in the United States.

First Monday generally dealt with two issues per episode.  Earlier in the series, that tended to be two cases.  Later in the series, that tended to be one case and one personal issue.

Characters

Main
 Justice Joseph Novelli (Joe Mantegna) was a newly appointed moderate Supreme Court Justice.
 Chief Justice Thomas Brankin (James Garner) was the football-obsessed, conservative Chief Justice of the United States.
 Justice Henry Hoskins (Charles Durning) was Brankin's best friend and a conservative justice, who often spouted limericks during conversation.
 Miguel Mora (Randy Vasquez) was Novelli's conservative law clerk.
 Ellie Pearson (Hedy Burress) was Novelli's liberal law clerk.
 Jerry Klein (Christopher Wiehl) was Novelli's moderate law clerk.
 Julian Lodge (Joe Flanigan) was Brankin's law clerk.

Other Supreme Court Justices
 Justice Esther Weisenberg (Camille Saviola) was a liberal justice.
 Justice Jerome Morris (James McEachin) was a liberal justice.
 Justice Michael Bancroft (James Karen) was a liberal justice.
 Justice Deborah Szwark (Gail Strickland) was a conservative justice.
 Justice Theodore Snow (Stephen Markle) was a liberal justice.
 Justice Brian Chandler (Lyman Ward) was a conservative justice.

Novelli's family
 Sarah Novelli (Linda Purl) was a real estate agent and Justice Joseph Novelli's wife.
 Andrew Novelli (Brandon Davis) was  Justice Joseph Novelli's son.
 Beth Novelli (Rachel Grate) was Justice Joseph Novelli's daughter.

Others
 Charles Bierbauer (himself) was host of Curveball, a political talk show.
 Senator Edward Sheffield (Dean Stockwell) was a liberal U.S. Senator who plotted to get Novelli impeached. Following the show's cancellation, Sheffield became a recurring character on JAG. The character later became the Secretary of the Navy.

Episodes

Nomination
Bruce Broughton was nominated for a 2002 Emmy Award for Outstanding Main Title Theme Music.

See also
 Supreme Court of the United States in fiction

References

External links
 
 

2002 American television series debuts
2002 American television series endings
2000s American drama television series
CBS original programming
English-language television shows
Television series by CBS Studios
Television shows set in Washington, D.C.
2000s American legal television series
Television series created by Donald P. Bellisario